Marlon Rodrigues Xavier (born 20 May 1997) is a Brazilian professional footballer who plays as a left-back for Campeonato Brasileiro Série A club Cruzeiro.

Professional career
Marlon made his professional debut for Criciúma in a 1-0 Campeonato Brasileiro Série B win over Botafogo on 7 November 2015. After spending his early career in Brazil with Criciúma and Fluminense, Marlon joined Boavista F.C. on loan on 5 August 2019.

Honours
Trabzonspor
Turkish Super Cup: 2020

References

External links
 
 Marlon Xavier at playmakerstats.com (English version of ogol.com.br)

1997 births
Living people
People from Cascavel
Brazilian footballers
Brazilian expatriate footballers
Trabzonspor footballers
Cruzeiro Esporte Clube players
Boavista F.C. players
Fluminense FC players
Criciúma Esporte Clube players
MKE Ankaragücü footballers
Süper Lig players
Primeira Liga players
Campeonato Brasileiro Série A players
Campeonato Brasileiro Série B players
Association football fullbacks
Brazilian expatriates in Portugal
Brazilian expatriate sportspeople in Turkey
Brazilian expatriate sportspeople in Portugal
Expatriate footballers in Turkey
Expatriate footballers in Portugal
Sportspeople from Paraná (state)